Sanford is a male given name of Old English origin, meaning "sandy ford". Notable people with the name include:

Sanford Barsky, American professor of pathology
Sanford Bates (1884–1972), American politician and administrator
Sanford Berman (born 1933), American librarian
Sanford I. Berman (1924–2015), American philanthropist and author 
Sanford Dennis Biggar, Canadian politician
Sanford Augustus Brookins (1877–1968), American architect and builder
Sanford Diller (born 1927), American billionaire 
Sanford Biggers (born 1970), American artist
Sanford Bishop (born 1947), American politician
Sanford Bookstaver (born 1973), American television director
Sanford Brown (writer) (born 1957), American Methodist minister
Sanford E. Charron (1917–2008), American politician
Sanford E. Church (1815–1880), American lawyer and politician
Sanford Clark (1935–2021), American singer and guitarist
Sanford Lockwood Cluett (1874–1968), American businessman and inventor
Sanford Coats (born 1971), American federal attorney
Sanford Johnston Crowe (1868–1931), Canadian politician
Sanford B. Dole (1844–1926), American politician and judge
Sanford Jay Frank (1954–2014), American television writer
Sanford Friedman (1928–2011), American novelist
Sanford Garelik (1918–2011), American politician
Sanford Robinson Gifford (1823–1880), American landscape painter
Sanford Gold (1911–1984), American jazz pianist
Sanford M. Green (1807–1901), American judge
Sanford J. Grossman (born 1953), American economist and historian 
Sanford Hunt (1881–1943), American football player and newspaper editor
Sanford Jackson (1909–2000), Canadian biochemist
Sanford M. Jacoby (born 1953), American economist
Sanford Kadish (1921–2014), American criminal law scholar
Sanford Brown Kellogg (1822–1893), American lawyer and politician
Sanford Kirkpatrick (1842–1932), American politician
Sanford "Sandy" Koufax (born 1935), American Major League Baseball Hall of Fame pitcher
Sanford Kwinter, Canadian-American writer and publisher
Sanford R. Leigh (born 1934), American civil rights activist
Sanford Levinson (born 1941), American legal scholar
Sanford Lieberson (born 1936), American film producer
Sanford N. McDonnell (1922–2012), American businessman
Sanford Meisner (1905–1997), American actor and acting teacher
Sanford K. Moats (born 1921), American Air Force officer
Sanford A. Moeller (1886–1960), American musician
Sanford Alexander Moss (1872–1946), American aviation engineer
Sanford Palay (1918–2002), American scientist and educator
Sanford Panitch, American film executive
Sanford Plummer (1905–1974), Native American painter
Sanford Jacob Ramey (1798–1866), American politician
Sanford Ransdell (1781–1854), American pioneer and soldier
Sanford E. Reisenbach (1932–2015), American marketing executive
Sanford Rosenthal (1897-1989), American scientist
Sanford Ross (1907–1954), American painter and printmaker
Sanford H. Roth (1906–1962), American photographer
Sanford Schram (born 1949), American political scientist and author
Sanford L. Segal (1937–2010), American mathematician
Sanford C. Sigoloff (1930-2011), American businessman
Sanford W. Smith (1869–1929), American judge
Sanford Socolow (1928–2015), American broadcast journalist
Sanford L. Steelman, Jr. (born 1951), American judge
Sanford Sylvan (born 1953), American baritone
Sanford E. Thompson (1867–1949), American engineer
Sanford J. Ungar (born 1945), American journalist and author
Sanford Wallace (born 1968), notorious American "Spam King"
Sanford I. Weill (born 1933), American banker
Sanford Wheeler (born 1970), first African-American Australian rules football player
Sanford White (1888–1964), American football and baseball player
Sanford Calvin Yoder (1879–1975), American Mennonite pastor and scholar
Sanford Yung (1927–2013), Hong Kong accountant and politician 
Sanford Myron Zeller (1885–1948), American mycologist

See also
Sanford (disambiguation)

Notes

English masculine given names